"Une autre histoire" is a 1987 pop song recorded by French singer Gérard Blanc. It was the first single from his debut album Ailleurs pour un ailleurs and was released in May 1987. It became a smash hit in France in the summer and was covered by several artists throughout the years, thus achieving cult status. It can be deemed as the singer's signature song.

Background
After being a member of Martin Circus band, Blanc tried to start a solo career as singer, in 1987. He released his first single, "Une autre histoire", written and composed by Marc Strawzynski and Blanc himself. A music video was shot in the Moroccan desert and shows Blanc's fiancée at the time, French host Annie Pujol. A maxi vinyl containing remixes versions was produced for the discothèques.

Chart performance
In France, "Une autre histoire" debuted at number 43 on the chart edition of 6 June 1987, climbed quickly and eventually reached number two for non consecutive two weeks, being blocked from the number one spot first by Madonna's "La Isla Bonita", then by Vanessa Paradis's "Joe le Taxi". It totaled 15 weeks in the top 10 and 25 weeks on the chart (top 50). It earned a Gold disc awarded by the Syndicat National de l'Édition Phonographique. On the European Hot 100 Singles, it started at number 86 on 27 June 1987, reached a peak of nymber 28 in its eleven week, and fell off the chart after 23 weeks of presence.

Cover versions
In 2004, "Une autre histoire" was covered by Les Enfoirés on their album Les Enfoirés dans l'espace, also available on their compilation La compil' (vol. 3). Houcine and Aurélie Konaté, two contestants of the second edition of Star Academy France, covered the song in 2002 on the album Fait sa boum. In 2006, the contestants of French TV show Nouvelle Star made their own version of the song. In December 2012, Eve Angeli covered "Une autre histoire" and made a music video for the song.

Track listings
 7" single
 "Une autre histoire" – 4:30
 "Dans quelle vie" – 4:40

 12" maxi
 "Une autre histoire" (special remix club by Dimitri from Paris) – 8:52
 "Une autre histoire" (special remix radio) – 4:27

 12" maxi
 "Une autre histoire" – 4:30
 "Dans quelle vie" – 5:25

Charts and certifications

Weekly charts

Year-end charts

Certifications

References

1987 debut singles
Gérard Blanc songs
1987 songs
EMI Records singles